This article is a list of episodes from the television series Just the Ten of Us.

Series overview
Broadcast History
 April 1988 – May 1988, ABC Tuesday 8:30–9:00
 September 1988 – June 1989, ABC Friday 9:30–10:00
 July 1989, ABC Wednesday 8:30–9:00
 August 1989 – July 1990, ABC Friday 9:30–10:00

Episodes

Season 1 (1988)

Season 2 (1988–89)

Season 3 (1989–90)

References

External links 

Just the Ten of Us